A breathalyzer or breathalyser (a portmanteau of breath and analyzer/analyser) is a device for estimating blood alcohol content (BAC), or to detect viruses or diseases from a breath sample.

The name is a genericized trademark of the Breathalyzer brand name of instruments developed by inventor Robert Frank Borkenstein in the 1950s.

Origins
A 1927 paper produced by Emil Bogen, who collected air in a football bladder and then tested this air for traces of alcohol, discovered that the alcohol content of 2 litres of expired air was a little greater than that of 1 cc of urine. However, research into the possibilities of using breath to test for alcohol in a person's body dates as far back as 1874, when Francis E. Anstie made the observation that small amounts of alcohol were excreted in breath.

Also, in 1927 a Chicago chemist, William Duncan McNally, invented a breathalyzer in which the breath moving through chemicals in water would change color.  One use for his invention was for  housewives to test whether their husbands had been drinking.

In late 1927, in a case in Marlborough, England, Gorsky, a police surgeon, asked a suspect to inflate a football bladder with his breath. Since the 2 liters of the man's breath contained 1.5 mg of ethanol,  Gorsky testified before the court that the defendant was "50% drunk".

In 1931 the first practical roadside breath-testing device was the drunkometer developed by Rolla Neil Harger of the Indiana University School of Medicine. The drunkometer collected a motorist's breath sample directly into a balloon inside the machine. The breath sample was then pumped through an acidified potassium permanganate solution. If there was alcohol in the breath sample, the solution changed color. The greater the color change, the more alcohol there was present in the breath.  The drunkometer was manufactured and sold by Stephenson Corporation of Red Bank, New Jersey.

In 1954 Robert Frank Borkenstein (1912–2002) was a captain with the Indiana State Police and later a professor at Indiana University Bloomington. His Breathalyzer used chemical oxidation and photometry to determine alcohol concentrations. Subsequent breath analyzers have converted primarily to infrared spectroscopy, though this method is subject to invalid results depending on ambient air temperature, the temperature of the device, and the body temperature of the subject, depending on specificity of the readings and how they correlate with one's BAC measured via a voluntary blood draw. The invention of the Breathalyzer provided law enforcement with an orally-invasive test providing immediate results to determine an individual's breath alcohol concentration at the time of testing, based on, according to this article, consistently faulty samples.

In 1967 in Britain, Bill Ducie and Tom Parry Jones developed and marketed the first electronic breathalyser. They established Lion Laboratories in Cardiff. Ducie was a chartered electrical engineer, and Tom Parry Jones was a lecturer at UWIST.   The Road Safety Act 1967 introduced the first legally enforceable maximum blood alcohol level for drivers in the UK, above which it became an offence to be in charge of a motor vehicle; and introduced the roadside breathalyser, made available to police forces across the country.  In 1979, Lion Laboratories' version of the breathalyser, known as the Alcolyser and incorporating crystal-filled tubes that changed colour above a certain level of alcohol in the breath, was approved for police use. Lion Laboratories won the Queen's Award for Technological Achievement for the product in 1980, and it began to be marketed worldwide. The Alcolyser was superseded by the Lion Intoximeter 3000 in 1983, and later by the Lion Alcolmeter and Lion Intoxilyser.  These later models used a fuel cell alcohol sensor rather than crystals, providing a more reliable curbside test and removing the need for blood or urine samples to be taken at a police station.  In 1991, Lion Laboratories was sold to the American company MPD, Inc.

Chemistry
When the user exhales into a breath analyzer, any ethanol present in their breath is oxidized to acetic acid at the anode:

C2H5OH(g) + H2O(l) → CH3COOH(l) + 4H+(aq) + 4e−

at the cathode, atmospheric oxygen is reduced:

O2(g) + 4H+(aq) + 4e− → 2H2O(l)

The overall reaction is the oxidation of ethanol to acetic acid and water.

C2H5OH(l) + O2(g) → CH3COOH(aq) + H2O(l)

The electric current produced by this reaction is measured by a microcontroller, and displayed as an approximation of overall blood alcohol content (BAC) by the Alcosensor.

Law enforcement
Breath analyzers do not directly measure blood alcohol content or concentration, which requires the analysis of a blood sample. Instead, they estimate BAC indirectly by measuring the amount of alcohol in one's breath. In general, two types of breathalyzer are used. Small hand-held breathalyzers are not reliable enough to provide evidence in court but reliable enough to justify an arrest. Larger breathalyzer devices found in police stations can then be used to produce court evidence.

Two breathalyzer technologies are most prevalent. Desktop analyzers generally use infrared spectrophotometer technology, electrochemical fuel cell technology, or a combination of the two.  Hand-held field testing devices are generally based on electrochemical platinum fuel cell analysis and, depending upon jurisdiction, may be used by officers in the field as a form of "field sobriety test" commonly called "preliminary breath test" or "preliminary alcohol screening" or as evidential devices in point of arrest testing.

In Canada, a preliminary non-evidentiary screening device can be approved by Parliament as an approved screening device, and an evidentiary breath instrument can be similarly designated as an approved instrument.  The US National Highway Traffic Safety Administration maintains a Conforming Products List of breath alcohol devices approved for evidentiary use, as well as for preliminary screening use. In order to demand a person produce a breathalyzer sample an officer must have "reasonable suspicion" that the person drove with more than 80 mg alcohol per 100 mL of blood. The demand must be within three hours of driving. Any driver that refuses can be charged under s.254 of the Criminal Code. With the legalization of cannabis, updates to the criminal code are proposed that will allow a breathalyzer test to be administered without suspicion of impairment.

In the United States, all states have implied consent laws, which means that by applying for a driver's license, drivers are agreeing to take any breathalyzer test under suspicion of a DUI.

Preliminary breath test or preliminary alcohol screening test
The preliminary breath test or preliminary alcohol screening test uses small hand-held breath analyzers (hand-held breathalyzers).  These units are similar to evidentiary breathalyzers, but typically are not calibrated frequently enough for evidentiary purposes.  (The terms "preliminary breath test" ("PBT") and "preliminary alcohol screening test" reference the same devices and functions.)  The test device provides numerical blood alcohol content (BAC) readings, although in some cases, the device has "pass/fail" indicia.  For example, in Canada, PST devices, called "alcohol screening devices" are set so that, from 0 to 49 mg% it shows digits, from 50 to 99 mg% it shows the word "warn" and 100 mg% and above it shows "fail".

These preliminary breath tests are sometimes categorised as part of field sobriety testing, although it is not part of a series of performance tests generally with field sobriety tests (FSTs) or standard field sobriety tests (SFSTs).  While the test device typically provides numerical BAC readings, its primary use is for screening and, in the US, establishing probable cause for arrest, to invoke the implied consent requirements.

Use of preliminary breath test or preliminary alcohol screening test in the United States
In the US, the primary use of preliminary breath test or preliminary alcohol screening devices is for screening and establishing probable cause for arrest, to invoke the implied consent requirements.

In US law, this is necessary to sustain a conviction based on evidential testing (or implied consent refusal).  In order to sustain a conviction based on evidential tests, probable cause must be shown (or the suspect must volunteer to take the evidential test without implied consent requirements being invoked).  Police are not obliged to advise the suspect that participation in a FST or other pre-arrest procedures is voluntary.  In contrast, formal evidentiary tests given under implied consent requirements are considered mandatory.

Refusal to take a preliminary breath test in the State of Michigan subjects a non-commercial driver to a "civil infraction" fine, with no violation "points", but is not considered to be a refusal under the general "implied consent" law.  In some states, the state may present evidence of refusal to take a field sobriety test in court, although this is of questionable probative value in a drunk driving prosecution.

Different requirements apply in many states to drivers under DUI probation, in which case participation in a preliminary breath test may be a condition of probation, and for commercial drivers under "drug screening" requirements.  Some US states, notably California, have statutes on the books penalizing preliminary breath test refusal for drivers under 21; however the Constitutionality of those statutes has not been tested.  (As a practical matter, most criminal lawyers advise suspects who refuse a preliminary breath test or preliminary alcohol screening to not engage in discussion or "justifying" the refusal with the police.)

Public and private consumer use
All breath alcohol testers used by law enforcement in the United States of America must be approved by the Department of Transportation's National Highway Traffic Safety Administration.

Public breathalyzers are becoming a method for consumers to test themselves at the source of alcohol consumption. These are used in pubs, bars, restaurants, charities, weddings and all types of licensed events. As breathalyzer tests have increased risk of transmission of coronavirus, they were temporarily suspended from use in Sweden.

Breath test evidence in the United States

 
The breath alcohol content reading is used in criminal prosecutions in two ways. The operator of a vehicle whose reading indicates a BAC over the legal limit for driving will be charged with having committed an illegal per se offense: that is, it is automatically illegal throughout the United States to drive a vehicle with a breath alcohol concentration (BrAC) of 0.08% or higher. One exception is the state of Wisconsin, where a first time drunk driving offense is normally a civil ordinance violation.

The uniformity is due to federal guidelines that states choose to adopt as motor vehicle laws are enacted by the individual states. It is said that the federal government ensures the passage of the federal guidelines by tying traffic safety highway funds to compliance with federal guidelines on certain issues, such as the federal government ensuring that the legal drinking age be the age of 21 across the 50 states. In earlier years, the range of the threshold varied considerably between States.

The breath analyzer reading will be offered as evidence of that crime, although the issue is what the BrAC was at the time of driving rather than at the time of the test. Some jurisdictions, such as the State of Washington, now allow the use of breath analyzer test results without regard as to how much time passed between operation of the vehicle and the time the test was administered. The suspect will also be charged with driving under the influence of alcohol (sometimes referred to as driving or operating while intoxicated). While BrAC tests are not necessary to prove a defendant was under the influence, laws in most states require the jury to presume that he was under the influence if his BrAC is found and believed to be over 0.08 (grams of alcohol/210 liters breath) when driving. In California, this is once again demonstrated by California Vehicle Code Section 23152(b) and Cal-Crim 2111, which states: "If the People have proved beyond a reasonable doubt that a sample of the defendant's (blood/breath/urine) was taken within three hours of the defendant's [alleged] driving and that a chemical analysis of the sample showed a blood alcohol level of 0.08 percent or more, you may, but are not required to, conclude that the defendant's blood alcohol level was 0.08 percent or more at the time of the alleged offense." This creates a rebuttable presumption, which means it is presumed, but that presumption can be rebutted if a jury finds it unreliable or if other evidence establishes a reasonable doubt as to whether the person actually drove with a breath or blood alcohol level of 0.08% or greater.  This would not apply to States that have done away with the presumption, such as the State of Washington, as previously referenced.

Infrared instruments are also known as "evidentiary breath testers" and generally produce court-admissible results. Other instruments, usually hand held in design, are known as "preliminary breath testers" , and their results, while valuable to an officer attempting to establish probable cause for a drunk driving arrest, are generally not admissible in court. Some states, such as Idaho, permit data or "readings" from hand-held preliminary breath testers or preliminary alcohol screeners to be presented as evidence in court. If at all, they are generally only admissible to show the presence of alcohol or as a pass-fail field sobriety test to help determine probable cause for arrest. South Dakota had previously relied solely on blood tests to ensure accuracy, but has implemented evidential blood alcohol breath tests since Sep-2011.

Historically, states initially tried to prohibit driving with a high level of BAC, and a BrAC test result was merely presented as indirect evidence of BAC.  Where the defendant had refused to take a subsequent blood test, the only way the state could prove BAC was by presenting scientific evidence of how alcohol in the breath gets there from alcohol in the blood, along with evidence of how to convert from one to the other.  DUI defense attorneys frequently contested the scientific reliability of such evidence.  In response, many states like California subsequently modified their BAC statutes so to directly prohibit a certain level of alcohol in the breath as an alternative to a prohibited level of BAC. In other words, the breath test result itself, the BrAC level, became the direct predicate evidence for conviction. In other states, such as New Jersey, the statute remains tied to BAC, but the BrAC results of certain machines have been judicially deemed presumptively accurate substitutes for blood testing when used as directed.

Common sources of error
Police in Victoria, Australia, use breathalyzers that give a recognized 20% tolerance on readings. Noel Ashby, former Victoria Police Assistant Commissioner (Traffic & Transport), claims that this tolerance is to allow for different body types.

Calibration
Many handheld breath analyzers sold to consumers use a silicon oxide sensor (also called a semiconductor sensor) to determine the blood alcohol concentration. These sensors are far more prone to contamination and interference from substances other than breath alcohol. The sensors require recalibration or replacement every six months. Higher-end personal breath analyzers and professional-use breath alcohol testers use platinum fuel cell sensors. These too require recalibration but at less frequent intervals than semiconductor devices, usually once a year.

Calibration is the process of checking and adjusting the internal settings of a breath analyzer by comparing and adjusting its test results to a known alcohol standard. Law enforcement breath analyzers need to be meticulously maintained and re-calibrated frequently to ensure accuracy.

There are two ways of calibrating a precision fuel cell breath analyzer, the wet-bath and the dry-gas methods. Each method requires specialized equipment and factory-trained technicians. It is not a procedure that can be conducted by untrained users or without the proper equipment.

The dry-gas method utilizes a portable calibration standard which is a precise mixture of ethanol and inert nitrogen available in a pressurized canister. Initial equipment costs are less than alternative methods and the steps required are fewer. The equipment is also portable allowing calibrations to be done when and where required.

The wet-bath method utilizes an ethanol/water standard in a precise specialized alcohol concentration, contained and delivered in specialized breath simulator equipment. The wet-bath method has a higher initial cost and is not intended to be portable. The standard must be fresh and replaced regularly. In addition, the assumed water-air partition ratio for aqueous ethanol must be taken into account along with its associated uncertainty.

Some semiconductor models are designed specifically to allow the sensor module to be replaced without the need to send the unit to a calibration lab.

Non-specific analysis
One major problem with older breath analyzers is non-specificity: the machines identify not only the ethyl alcohol (or ethanol) found in alcoholic beverages but also other substances similar in molecular structure or reactivity.

The oldest breath analyzer models pass breath through a solution of potassium dichromate, which oxidizes ethanol into acetic acid, changing color in the process. A monochromatic light beam is passed through this sample, and a detector records the change in intensity and, hence, the change in color, which is used to calculate the percent alcohol in the breath. However, since potassium dichromate is a strong oxidizer, numerous alcohol groups can be oxidized by it, producing false positives. This source of false positives is unlikely as very few other substances found in exhaled air are oxidizable.

Infrared-based breath analyzers project an infrared beam of radiation through the captured breath in the sample chamber and detect the absorbance of the compound as a function of the wavelength of the beam, producing an absorbance spectrum that can be used to identify the compound, as the absorbance is due to the harmonic vibration and stretching of specific bonds in the molecule at specific wavelengths (see infrared spectroscopy). The characteristic bond of alcohols in infrared is the O-H bond, which gives a strong absorbance at a short wavelength. The more light is absorbed by compounds containing the alcohol group, the less reaches the detector on the other side—and the higher the reading. Other groups, most notably aromatic rings and carboxylic acids can give similar absorbance readings.

Interfering compounds
Some natural and volatile interfering compounds do exist, however. For example, the National Highway Traffic Safety Administration has found that dieters and diabetics may have acetone levels hundreds or even thousands of times higher than those in others. Acetone is one of the many substances that can be falsely identified as ethyl alcohol by some breath machines. However, fuel cell based systems are non-responsive to substances like acetone.

Substances in the environment can also lead to false BAC readings. For example, methyl tert-butyl ether, a common gasoline additive, has been alleged anecdotally to cause false positives in persons exposed to it. Tests have shown this to be true for older machines; however, newer machines detect this interference and compensate for it. Any number of other products found in the environment or workplace can also cause erroneous BAC results. These include compounds found in lacquer, paint remover, celluloid, gasoline, and cleaning fluids, especially ethers, alcohols, and other volatile compounds.

Homeostatic variables
Breath analyzers assume that the subject being tested has a 2100-to-1 partition ratio in converting alcohol measured in the breath to estimates of alcohol in the blood. If the instrument estimates the BAC, then it measures weight of alcohol to volume of breath, so it will effectively measure grams of alcohol per 2100 ml of breath given. This measure is in direct proportion to the amount of grams of alcohol to every 1 ml of blood. Therefore, there is a 2100-to-1 ratio of alcohol in blood to alcohol in breath. However, this assumed partition ratio varies from 1300:1 to 3100:1 or wider among individuals and within a given individual over time. Assuming a true (and US legal) blood-alcohol concentration of 0.07%, for example, a person with a partition ratio of 1500:1 would have a breath test reading of 0.10%—over the legal limit.

Most individuals do, in fact, have a 2100-to-1 partition ratio in accordance with William Henry's law, which states that when the water solution of a volatile compound is brought into equilibrium with air, there is a fixed ratio between the concentration of the compound in air and its concentration in water. This ratio is constant at a given temperature. The human body is 37 degrees Celsius on average. Breath leaves the mouth at a temperature of 34 degrees Celsius. Alcohol in the body obeys Henry's Law as it is a volatile compound and diffuses in body water. To ensure that variables such as fever and hypothermia could not be pointed out to influence the results in a way that was harmful to the accused, the instrument is calibrated at a ratio of 2100:1, underestimating by 9 percent. In order for a person running a fever to significantly overestimate, he would have to have a fever that would likely see the subject in the hospital rather than driving in the first place. Studies suggest that about 1.8% of the population have a partition ratio below 2100:1. Thus, a machine using a 2100-to-1 ratio could actually overestimate the BAC. As much as 14% of the population has a partition ratio above 2100, thus causing the machine to under-report the BAC. Further, the assumption that the test subject's partition ratio will be average—that there will be 2100 parts in the blood for every part in the breath—means that accurate analysis of a given individual's blood alcohol by measuring breath alcohol is difficult, as the ratio varies considerably.

Variance in how much one breathes out can also give false readings, usually low. This is due to biological variance in breath alcohol concentration as a function of the volume of air in the lungs, an example of a factor which interferes with the liquid-gas equilibrium assumed by the devices. The presence of volatile components is another example of this; mixtures of volatile compounds can be more volatile than their components, which can create artificially high levels of ethanol (or other) vapors relative to the normal biological blood/breath alcohol equilibrium.

Mouth alcohol
One of the most common causes of falsely high breath analyzer readings is the existence of mouth alcohol. In analyzing a subject's breath sample, the breath analyzer's internal computer is making the assumption that the alcohol in the breath sample came from alveolar air—that is, air exhaled from deep within the lungs. However, alcohol may have come from the mouth, throat or stomach for a number of reasons. To help guard against mouth-alcohol contamination, certified breath-test operators are trained to observe a test subject carefully for at least 15–20 minutes before administering the test.

The problem with mouth alcohol being analyzed by the breath analyzer is that it was not absorbed through the stomach and intestines and passed through the blood to the lungs. In other words, the machine's computer is mistakenly applying the partition ratio (2100:1, see above) and multiplying the result. Consequently, a very tiny amount of alcohol from the mouth, throat or stomach can have a significant impact on the breath-alcohol reading.

Other than recent drinking, the most common source of mouth alcohol is from belching or burping. This causes the liquids and/or gases from the stomach—including any alcohol—to rise up into the soft tissue of the esophagus and oral cavity, where it will stay until it has dissipated. The American Medical Association concludes in its Manual for Chemical Tests for Intoxication (1959): "True reactions with alcohol in expired breath from sources other than the alveolar air (eructation, regurgitation, vomiting) will, of course, vitiate the breath alcohol results."  For this reason, police officers are supposed to keep a DUI suspect under observation for at least 15 minutes prior to administering a breath test. Instruments such as the Intoxilyzer 5000 also feature a "slope" parameter. This parameter detects any decrease in alcohol concentration of 0.006 g per 210 L of breath in 0.6 second, a condition indicative of residual mouth alcohol, and will result in an "invalid sample" warning to the operator, notifying the operator of the presence of the residual mouth alcohol. Preliminary breath testers, however, feature no such safeguard.

Acid reflux, or gastroesophageal reflux disease, can greatly exacerbate the mouth-alcohol problem. The stomach is normally separated from the throat by a valve, but when this valve becomes incompetent or herniated, there is nothing to stop the liquid contents in the stomach from rising and permeating the esophagus and mouth. The contents—including any alcohol—are then later exhaled into the breathalyzer. One study of 10 individuals suffering from this condition did not find any actual increase in breath ethanol.

Mouth alcohol can also be created in other ways. Dentures, some have theorized, will trap alcohol, although experiments have shown no difference if the normal 15 minute observation period is observed.  Periodontal disease can also create pockets in the gums which will contain the alcohol for longer periods. Also known to produce false results due to residual alcohol in the mouth is passionate kissing with an intoxicated person. Recent use of mouthwash or breath fresheners can skew results upward as they can contain fairly high levels of alcohol.

Testing during absorptive phase
Absorption of alcohol continues for anywhere from 20 minutes (on an empty stomach) to two-and-one-half hours (on a full stomach) after the last consumption. Peak absorption generally occurs within an hour.  During the initial absorptive phase, the distribution of alcohol throughout the body is not uniform. Uniformity of distribution, called equilibrium, occurs just as absorption completes. In other words, some parts of the body will have a higher blood alcohol content (BAC) than others. One aspect of the non-uniformity before absorption is complete is that the BAC in arterial blood will be higher than in venous blood.  
Other false positive of high BAC and also blood reading are related to Patients with proteinuria and hematuria, due to kidney metabolization and failure.
The metabolization rate of related patients with kidney damage is abnormal in relation to percent in alcohol in the breath. However, since potassium dichromate is a strong oxidizer, numerous alcohol groups can be oxidized by kidney and blood filtration, producing false positives.

During the initial absorption phase, arterial blood alcohol concentrations are higher than venous. After absorption, venous blood is higher. This is especially true with bolus dosing (Canadian term). With additional doses of alcohol, the body can reach a sustained equilibrium when absorption and elimination are proportional, calculating a general absorption rate of 0.02/drink and a general elimination rate of 0.015/hour.

Breath alcohol is a representation of the equilibrium of alcohol concentration as the blood gases (alcohol) pass from the (arterial) blood into the lungs to be expired in the breath. Arterial blood distributes oxygen throughout the body. Breath alcohol concentrations are generally lower than blood alcohol concentrations, because a true representation of blood alcohol concentration is only possible if the lungs were able to completely deflate.  Vitreous (eye) fluid provides the most accurate account of blood alcohol concentration.

Drinking after driving
A common defense to an impaired driving charge (in appropriate circumstances) is that the consumption of alcohol occurred subsequent to driving.  The typical circumstance where this comes up is when a driver consumes alcohol after a road accident, as an affirmative defense.  This closely relates to absorptive stage intoxication (or bolus drinking), except that the consumption of alcohol also occurred after driving.  This defense can be overcome by retrograde extrapolation (infra), but complicates prosecution.

While jurisdictions that recognise absorptive stage intoxication as a defense would also accept a defense of consumption after driving, some jurisdictions penalise post-driving drinking.  While laws regarding absorption of alcohol consumed before (or while) driving are generally per se, most statutes directed to post-driving consumption allow defenses for circumstances related to activity not related to.  In Canada, it is illegal to be over the impaired driving limits within 3 hours of driving (given as 2  hours by CDN DOJ); however, the new law allows a "drinking after driving" defence in a situation where a driver had no reason to expect a demand by the police for breath testing.  South Africa is more straightforward, with a separate penalty applied for consumption "After An Accident" until reported to the police and if so required, has been medically examined.

Retrograde extrapolation
The breath analyzer test is usually administered at a police station, commonly an hour or more after the arrest.  Although this gives the BrAC at the time of the test, it does not by itself answer the question of what it was at the time of driving.  The prosecution typically provides an estimated alcohol concentration at the time of driving utilizing retrograde extrapolation, presented by expert opinion.  This involves projecting back in time to estimate the BrAC level at the time of driving, by applying the physiological properties of absorption and elimination rates in the human body.

Extrapolation is calculated using five factors and a general elimination rate of 0.015/hour.

Example Time of breath test-10:00pm...Result of breath test-0.080...Time of driving-9:00pm (stopped by officer)...Time of last drink-8:00pm...Last food-12:00pm. Using these facts, an expert can say the person's last drink was consumed on an empty stomach, which means absorption of the last drink (at 8:00) was complete within one hour-9:00. At the time of the stop, the driver is fully absorbed. The test result of 0.080 was at 10:00. So the one hour of elimination that has occurred since the stop is added in, making 0.080+0.015=0.095 the approximate breath alcohol concentration at the time of the stop.

Breathalyzer sensors 

Photovoltaic assay The photovoltaic assay, used only in the dated photoelectric intoximeter, is a form of breath testing rarely encountered today. The process works by using photocells to analyze the color change of a redox (oxidation-reduction) reaction. A breath sample is bubbled through an aqueous solution of sulfuric acid, potassium dichromate, and silver nitrate. The silver nitrate acts as a catalyst, allowing the alcohol to be oxidized at an appreciable rate. The requisite acidic condition needed for the reaction might also be provided by the sulfuric acid. In solution, ethanol reacts with the potassium dichromate, reducing the dichromate ion to the chromium (III) ion. This reduction results in a change of the solution's color from red-orange to green. The reacted solution is compared to a vial of non-reacted solution by a photocell, which creates an electric current proportional to the degree of the color change; this current moves the needle that indicates BAC. Like other methods, breath testing devices using chemical analysis are prone to false readings. Compounds that have compositions similar to ethanol, for example, could also act as reducing agents, creating the necessary color change to indicate increased BAC.

 Infrared spectroscopy Infrared breathalyzers allow a high degree of specificity for ethanol. Typically evidential breath alcohol instruments in police stations will work on the principle of infrared spectroscopy.

 Fuel cell Fuel cell gas sensors are based on the oxidation of ethanol to acetaldehyde on an electrode. The current produced is proportional to the amount of alcohol present. These sensors are very stable, typically requiring calibration every 6 months, and are the type of sensor usually found in roadside breath testing devices.

 Semiconductor Semiconductor gas sensors are based on the increase in conductance of a tin oxide layer in the presence of a reducing gas such as vaporized ethanol. They are found in inexpensive breathalyzers and their stability is not as reliable as fuel cell instruments.

Breath analyzer myths
There are a number of substances or techniques that can supposedly "fool" a breath analyzer (i.e., generate a lower blood alcohol content).

A 2003 episode of the science television show MythBusters tested a number of methods that supposedly allow a person to fool a breath analyzer test. The methods tested included breath mints, onions, denture cream, mouthwash, pennies and batteries; all of these methods proved ineffective. The show noted that using these items to cover the smell of alcohol may fool a person, but, since they will not actually reduce a person's BrAC, there will be no effect on a breath analyzer test regardless of the quantity used, if any, it appeared that using mouthwash only raised the BrAC. Pennies supposedly produce a chemical reaction, while batteries supposedly create an electrical charge, yet neither of these methods affected the breath analyzer results.

The MythBusters episode also pointed out another complication: it would be necessary to insert the item into one's mouth (for example, eat an onion, rinse with mouthwash, conceal a battery), take the breath test, and then possibly remove the item — all of which would have to be accomplished discreetly enough to avoid alerting the police officers administering the test (who would obviously become very suspicious if they noticed that a person was inserting items into their mouth prior to taking a breath test). It would likely be very difficult, especially for someone in an intoxicated state, to be able to accomplish such a feat.

In addition, the show noted that breath tests are often verified with blood tests (BAC, which are more accurate) and that even if a person somehow managed to fool a breath test, a blood test would certainly confirm a person's guilt.

Other substances that might reduce the BrAC reading include a bag of activated charcoal concealed in the mouth (to absorb alcohol vapor), an oxidizing gas (such as N2O, Cl2, O3, etc.) that would fool a fuel cell type detector, or an organic interferent to fool an infrared absorption detector. The infrared absorption detector is more vulnerable to interference than a laboratory instrument measuring a continuous absorption spectrum since it only makes measurements at particular discrete wavelengths. However, due to the fact that any interference can only cause higher absorption, not lower, the estimated blood alcohol content will be overestimated. Additionally, Cl2 is toxic and corrosive.

A 2007 episode of the Spike network's show Manswers showed some of the more common and not-so-common ways of attempts to beat the breath analyzer, none of which work. Test 1 was to suck on a copper-coated coin such as a penny. Test 2 was to hold a battery on the tongue. Test 3 was to chew gum. None of these tests showed a "pass" reading if the subject had consumed alcohol.

Products that interfere with testing
It is alleged that products such as mouthwash or breath spray can "fool" breath machines by significantly raising test results.  Listerine mouthwash, for example, contains 27% alcohol. The breath machine is calibrated with the assumption that the alcohol is coming from alcohol in the blood diffusing into the lung rather than directly from the mouth, so it applies a partition ratio of 2100:1 in computing blood alcohol concentration—resulting in a false high test reading. To counter this, officers are not supposed to administer a preliminary breath test for 15 minutes after the subject eats, vomits, or puts anything in their mouth. In addition, most instruments require that the individual be tested twice at least two minutes apart. Mouthwash or other mouth alcohol will have somewhat dissipated after two minutes and cause the second reading to disagree with the first, requiring a retest. (Also see the discussion of the "slope parameter" of the Intoxilyzer 5000 in the "mouth alcohol" section above.)

A scientist tested the effects of Binaca breath spray on an Intoxilyzer 5000. He performed 23 tests with subjects who sprayed their throats and obtained readings as high as 0.81—far beyond legal levels. The scientist also noted that the effects of the spray did not fall below detectable levels until after 18 minutes.

See also 
Coronavirus breathalyzer

References

External links 

 
Alcohol law
Vehicle safety technologies
Brands that became generic
Driving under the influence
Law enforcement equipment
Spectroscopy
Harm reduction
Drug testing